In enzymology, a (S,S)-butanediol dehydrogenase is an enzyme that catalyzes the chemical reaction

(S,S)-butane-2,3-diol + NAD  acetoin + NADH + H

Thus, the two substrates of this enzyme are (S,S)-butane-2,3-diol and NAD, whereas its 3 products are acetoin, NADH, and H.

This enzyme belongs to the family of oxidoreductases, specifically those acting on the CH-OH group of donor with NAD or NADP as acceptor. The systematic name of this enzyme class is (S,S)-butane-2,3-diol:NAD oxidoreductase. Other names in common use include L-butanediol dehydrogenase, L-BDH, and L()-2,3-butanediol dehydrogenase (L-acetoin forming). This enzyme participates in butanoic acid metabolism.

References 

 

EC 1.1.1
NADH-dependent enzymes
Enzymes of unknown structure